Henry Jacob Landau is an American mathematician known for his contributions to information theory, including the theory of bandlimited functions and on moment issues.

Landau attended the Bronx High School of Science. He received an A.B. (1953), A.M. (1955) and Ph.D. (1957) from Harvard University. His thesis On Canonical Conformal Maps of Multiply Connected Regions was advised by Lars Ahlfors and Joseph Leonard Walsh.

Landau later became Distinguished Member of Technical Staff at Bell Laboratories and a twice visiting member at the Institute for Advanced Study in Princeton. He has also served as an adjunct professor at City University of New York, the Chinese University of Hong Kong, and Columbia University.

Publications

The following is a list of publications:

 On Uniform Approximation to Continuous Functions by Rational Functions with Preassigned Poles, H. J. Landau,  Proc. Amer. Math. Soc., 5 (1954), pp. 671–676.
 Operational Requirements for a Collision Warning System, Eduardo I. Pina and H. J. Landau, Operations Research, 5 (1957), pp. 794–814.
 Some Distortion Theorems for Multivalent Mappings, H. J. Landau and Robert Osserman, Proc. Amer. Math. Soc., 10 (1959), pp. 87–91.
 On Canonical Conformal Maps of Multiply Connected Regions, J. L. Walsh and H. J. Landau, Trans. Amer. Math. Soc., 93:1 (October 1959), pp. 81–96.
 On the Recovery of a Band-Limited Signal, After Instantaneous Companding and Subsequent Band Limiting, H. J. Landau, Bell Sys. Tech. J., 39:2 (March 1960), pp. 351–364.
 On Analytic Mappings of Riemann Surfaces, R. Osserman and H. J. Landau, J. d'Analyse Mathematique, 7 (1960), pp. 249–279.
 Prolate Spheroidal Wave Functions, Fourier Analysis and Uncertainty, II, Henry O. Pollak and H. J. Landau, Bell Sys. Tech. J., 40:1 (January 1961), pp. 65–84.
 The Recovery of Distorted Band-Limited Signals, Willard L. Miranker and H. J. Landau, J. Math. Anal. and Appl., 2:1 (February 1961), pp. 97–104.
 On Canonical Conformal Maps of Multiply Connected Domains, H. J. Landau, Trans. Amer. Math. Soc., 99:1 (April 1961), pp. 1–20.
 Prolate Spheroidal Functions, Fourier Analysis and Uncertainty, III. The Dimension of the Space of Essentially Time- and Band-Limited Signals, H. J. Landau and H. O. Pollak, Bell Sys. Tech. J., 41 (July 1962), pp. 1295–1336.
 A Sparse Regular Sequence of Exponentials Closed on Large Sets, H. J. Landau, Bull. Amer. Math. Soc., 70 (1964), pp. 566–569.
 The Eigenvalue Behavior of Certain Convolution Equations, H. J. Landau, Trans. Amer. Math. Soc., 115 (March 1965), pp. 242–256.
 On the Optimality of the Regular Simplex Code, H. J. Landau and David Slepian, Bell Sys. Tech. J., 45 (October 1966), pp. 1247–1272.
 Necessary Density Conditions for Sampling and Interpolation of Certain Entire Functions, H. J. Landau, Acta Math., 117 (February 1967), pp. 37–52.
 Sampling, Data Transmission, and the Nyquist Rate, H. J. Landau, Proc. IEEE, 55 (October 1967), pp. 1701–1706.
 On the Supremum of a Gaussian Process, H. J. Landau and Lawrence Shepp, Sankhya A, 32 (December 1970), pp. 369–378.
 How Does a Porcupine Separate its Quills, H. J. Landau, IEEE Trans. on Information Theory, It-17:2 (1971), pp. 157–161.
 Some Computer Experiments in Picture Processing for Bandwidth Reduction, H. J. Landau and D. Slepian, Bell Sys. Tech. J., 50:5 (1971), pp. 1525–1540.
 On the Completeness of a Set of Translates, H. J. Landau, J. Approx. Theory, 5:4 (1972), pp. 438–440.
 On Szegö's Eigenvalue Distribution Theorem and Non-Hermitian Kernels, H. J. Landau, J. d'Analyse Mathematique, 28 (1975), pp. 335–357.
 Loss in Unstable Resonators, H. J. Landau, J. Opt. Soc. Amer., 66:6 (June 1976), pp. 525–529.
 Pricing in a Dynamic Model with Saturation, H. J. Landau, Econometrica, 44:6 (November 1976), pp. 1153–1156.
 The Notion of Approximate Eigenvalues Applied to an Integral Equation of Laser Theory, H. J. Landau, Quart. Appl. Math., April 1977, pp. 165–172.
 A Note on the Eigenvalues of Hermitian Matrices, D. Slepian and H. J. Landau, SIAM J. Math. Anal., 9:2 (1978), pp. 291–297.
 A Game-Theoretic Analysis of Bargaining with Reputations, Robert W. Rosenthal and H. J. Landau, Journal of Mathematical Psychology, 20:3 (1979), pp. 233–255.
 The Classical Moment Problem, Hilbertian Proofs, H. J. Landau, Journal of Functional Analysis, 38 (1980), pp. 255–272.
 On Comparison of Cash Flow Streams, H. J. Landau, Management Science, 26:12 (1980), pp. 1218–1226.
 The Eigenvalue Distribution of Time and Frequency Limiting, H. J. Landau and Harold Widom, J. Math. Anal. and Appl., 77:2 (1980), pp. 469–481.
 Repeated Bargaining with Opportunities for Learning, R. W. Rosenthal and H. J. Landau, J. Math. Sociology, 8 (1981), pp. 61–74.
 Bounds for Eigenvalues of Certain Stochastic Matrices, H. J. Landau and Andrew Odlyzko, Linear Algebra and Its Applications, 38 (1981), pp. 5–15.
 The Inverse Problem for the Vocal Tract and the Moment Problem, H. J. Landau, SIAM J. Math. Anal., 14:5 (1983), pp. 1019–1035.
 Mobility and Wages, H. J. Landau and Andrew Weiss (economist), Economics Letters, 15 (1984), pp. 97–102.
 Optimum Waveform Signal Sets with Amplitude and Energy Constraints, H. J. Landau and Aaron D. Wyner, IEEE Trans. Inf. Theory, IT-30:4 (1984), pp. 615–622.
 Wages, Hiring Standards, and Firm Size, H. J. Landau and A. M. Weiss, J. Labor Econ., 2:4 (1984), pp. 477–499.
 Diffusion, Cell Mobility and Bandlimited Functions, H. J. Landau, Benjamin F. Logan, L. A. Shepp and N. Bauman, SIAM J. Appl. Math., 44:6 (1984), pp. 1232–1245.
 The Stationary Distribution of Reflected Brownian Motion in a Planar Region, J. Michael Harrison, H. J. Landau and L. A. Shepp, Annals of Probability, 13:3 (1985), pp. 744–757.
 An Overview of Time and Frequency Limiting, H. J. Landau, Fourier Techniques and Applications, J. F. Price (editor), Plenum, New York, 1985, pp. 201–220.
 An Inequality Conjectured by Hajela and Seymour Arising in Combinatorial Geometry, H. J. Landau, B. F. Logan and L. A. Shepp, Combinatorica, 5:4 (1985), pp. 337–342.
 Extrapolating a Band-Limited Function from Its Samples Taken in a Finite Interval, H. J. Landau, IEEE Trans. Inf. Theory, IT-32:4 (1986), pp. 464–470.
 Maximum Entropy and the Moment Problem, H. J. Landau, Bull. Amer. Math. Soc., 16:1 (1987), pp. 47–77.
 Polynomials Orthogonal on the Semicircle, II, Walter Gautschi, H. J. Landau and Gradimir Milovanović, Constr. Approx., 3:4 (1987), pp. 389–404.
 Moments in Mathematics, H. J. Landau, Proc. Symp. Appl. Math., (editor), Amer. Math. Soc., 37 (1987).
 Classical Background of the Moment Problem, H. J. Landau, Proc. Symp. Appl. Math., 37 (1987), pp. 1–15.
 Polynomials Orthogonal in an Indefinite Metric, H. J. Landau, Operator Theory: Advances and Applications, 34 (1988), pp. 203–214.
 On the Minimum Distance Problem for Faster-than-Nyquist Signaling, James E. Mazo and H. J. Landau, IEEE Trans. Inf. Theory, IT-34:6 (1989), pp. 1420–1427.
 On the Density of Phase-Space Expansions, H. J. Landau, IEEE Trans. on Information Theory, IT-39:4 (1993), pp. 1152–1156.
 The Inverse Eigenvalue Problem for Real Symmetric Toeplitz Matrices, H. J. Landau, J. Amer. Math. Soc., 7:3 (1994), pp. 749–767.
 Prediction and the Inverse of Toeplitz Matrices, Israel Gohberg and H. J. Landau, Approximation and Computation, Int. Series of Numerical Mathematics, R. Zahar (editor), Birkhauser, Boston, 119 (1995), pp. 219–230.
 Gabor Time-Frequency Lattices and the Wexler-Raz Identity, Ingrid Daubechies, H. J. Landau and Zeph Landau, J. Fourier Analysis and Appl., (4):437–478, 1995
 An iterated random function with Lipschitz number one, Aaron Abrams, H.J. Landau, Z. Landau, James Pommersheim, Eric Zaslow, Theory of Probability and Its Applications, 47(2):286–300, 2002
 Evasive random walks and the clairvoyant demon, A. Abrams, H.J. Landau, Z. Landau, J. Pommersheim, E. Zaslow, Random Structures and Algorithms, 20(2):239–248, 2002
 Random Multiplication Approaches Uniform Measure in Finite Groups, A. Abrams, H.J. Landau, Z. Landau, J. Pommersheim, E. Zaslow, Journal of Theoretical Probability, 20(1), March, 2007

References

Year of birth missing (living people)
Living people
Harvard University alumni
Scientists at Bell Labs
20th-century American mathematicians
21st-century American mathematicians
American information theorists
Columbia University faculty
Place of birth missing (living people)